Maximilian Sauer (born 15 May 1994) is a German professional footballer who plays for Danish 1st Division club HB Køge.

Career
Between 2009 and 2013, Sauer played for the youth teams of VfL Wolfsburg. In 2013, he was part of Wolfsburg's Under 19 Bundesliga winning squad.

In the 2013–2014 season, Sauer started his senior career at Regionalliga Südwest club KSV Hessen Kassel. Before the 2014–2015 season, he transferred to Eintracht Braunschweig's reserve side in the Regionalliga Nord.

On the 15th matchday of the 2014–15 2. Bundesliga season, he made his professional debut for Eintracht's senior side, playing the full 90 minutes in a match against 1. FC Nürnberg.

In the summer of 2020, he moved to MSV Duisburg. After one season, he signed for HB Køge.

Career statistics

Club

References

External links

1994 births
Living people
People from Salzgitter
Footballers from Lower Saxony
Association football defenders
German footballers
KSV Hessen Kassel players
Eintracht Braunschweig players
Eintracht Braunschweig II players
SpVgg Greuther Fürth players
SpVgg Greuther Fürth II players
MSV Duisburg players
HB Køge players
2. Bundesliga players
Regionalliga players
German expatriate footballers
Expatriate men's footballers in Denmark
German expatriate sportspeople in Denmark